The 1913–14 season was Madrid Football Club's 12th season in existence. The club played some friendly matches. They also played in the Campeonato Regional Centro (Central Regional Championship).

Competitions

Overview

Campeonato Regional Centro

League table

Matches

Friendlies

Copa Espuñes

Notes

References

External links
Realmadrid.com Official Site
1913–14 Squad
1913–14 matches
1913–14 (Campeonato de Madrid)
International Friendlies of Real Madrid CF – Overview

Real Madrid
Real Madrid CF seasons